Chilina is a genus of air-breathing freshwater snails, aquatic pulmonate gastropod mollusks in the superfamily Chilinoidea.

Chilina is the only genus in the family Chilinidae.

Distribution 

Chilinidae occupies the temperate and cold zones of South America from the Tropic of Capricorn to Cape Horn and Falkland Islands. Distribution of Chilina include Argentina (17 species, 12 of them are endemic), Uruguay (2 species), Brazil (about 4 species).

Taxonomy 
The family Chilinidae has been classified in the clade Hygrophila within the informal group Basommatophora (according to the taxonomy of the Gastropoda by Bouchet & Rocroi, 2005). There are no subfamilies.

Species 
Species within the genus Chilina include:
 Chilina acuminata G. B. Sowerby II, 1874
 Chilina amoena E. A. Smith, 1882
 Chilina ampullacea G. B. Sowerby I, 1838
 Chilina angusta (Philippi, 1860)
 Chilina aurantia Marshall, 1924
 Chilina bullocki W. B. Marshall, 1933
 Chilina bulloides d'Orbigny, 1835
 Chilina campylaxis Pilsbry, 1911
 Chilina cuyana Gutiérrez Gregoric, Ciocco & Rumi, 2014
 Chilina dombeiana (Bruguière, 1789)
 Chilina elegans Frauenfeld, 1865
 Chilina falklandica Cooper & Preston
 Chilina fasciata (Gould, 1847)
 Chilina fluctuosa (Gray, 1828): nomen inquirendum
 Chilina fluminea (Maton, 1809)
 Chilina fuegiensis E. A. Smith, 1905
 Chilina fulgurata Pilsbry, 1911
 Chilina fusca Mabille, 1884
 Chilina gallardoi Castellanos & Gaillard, 1981
 Chilina gibbosa G. B. Sowerby I, 1841
 Chilina globosa Frauenfeld, 1881
 Chilina guaraniana Castellanos & Miquel, 1980
 Chilina iguazuensis Gregoric & Rumi, 2008
 Chilina lebruni Mabille, 1884
 Chilina lilloi Ovando & Gutiérrez Gregoric, 2012
 Chilina limnaeiformis Dall, 1870
 Chilina llanquihuensis W. B. Marshall, 1933
 Chilina major G. B. Sowerby I, 1838 (taxon inquirendum)
 Chilina megastoma Hylton Scott, 1958
 Chilina mendozana Ströbel, 1874
 Chilina minuta Haas, 1951
 Chilina monticola Strebel, 1907
 Chilina nervosa (Mabille & Rochebrune, 1889)
 Chilina neuquenensis Marshall, 1933
 Chilina obovata (Gould, 1847)
 Chilina olivacea W. B. Marshall, 1924
 Chilina ovalis G. B. Sowerby I, 1838
 Chilina parchappii (d'Orbigny, 1835)
 Chilina parva Martens, 1868
 Chilina patagonica Sowerby II, 1874
 Chilina perrieri Mabille, 1833
 Chilina portillensis Hidalgo, 1880
 Chilina puelcha d'Orbigny, 1838
 Chilina pulchella d'Orbigny, 1835
 Chilina robustior G. B. Sowerby I, 1838
 Chilina rushii Pilsbry, 1911
 Chilina sanjuanina Gutiérrez Gregoric, Ciocco & Rumi, 2014
 Chilina smithi Pilsbry, 1911
 Chilina strebeli Pilsbry, 1911
 Chilina subcylindrica G. B. Sowerby II, 1874
 Chilina tehuelcha d'Orbigny, 1837
 Chilina tenuis G. B. Sowerby I, 1838
 Chilina tucumanensis Castellanos & Miquel, 1980

Ecology 
Within their area, the Chilinidae are abundant snails in all suitable stations, as Physidae are in North America. They swarm in springs, small streams, lakes, and in some places the margins of rivers. They are most abundant southward, becoming rarer and local toward the northern borders of their range.

Chilina gibbosa and Chilina fluminea are medically important, because they transfer parasites causing dermatitis.

References 
This article incorporates public domain text from the reference

Further reading 
 Brace R. C. (1983). "Observations on the morphology and behaviour of Chilina fluctuosa Gray (Chilinidae), with a discussion on the early evolution of pulmonate gastropods". Philosophical Transactions of the Royal Society, (ser. B) 300: 463–491.
 Castellanos Z. A. de & Gaillard M. C. (1981). "Mollusca Gasterópoda: Chilinidae". Fauna de Agua Dulce de la República Argentina. PROFADU (CONICET), Buenos Aires 15: 423–51.
 Haeckel W. (1911). "Beiträge zur Anatomie der Gattung Chilina". Zoologische Jahrbücher, Supplement 13: 89–136.
 Harry W. H. (1964). "The anatomy of Chilina fluctuosa Gray reexamined, with prolegomena on the phylogeny of the higher limnic Basommatophora (Gastropoda: Pulmonata)". Malacologia 1: 355–385.
 Hidalgo J. G. (1880). "Description d'une nouvelle espece de Chilina". Journal de Conchyliologie 20: 322–323.
 Hylton Scott M. I. (1958). "Nueva especie de Chilina del norte Argentino". Neotropica 4: 26–27.
 Ituarte C. F. (1997). "Chilina megastoma Hylton Scott, 1958 (Pulmonata: Basommatophora): a study on topotypic specimens. American Malacological Bulletin 14: 9–15.
 Martín P. R. (2003). "Allometric growth an inter-population morphological variation of the freshwater snail Chilina parchappii (Gastropoda: Chilinidae) in the Napostá Grande stream, southern Pampas, Argentina". Studies on Neotropical Fauna and Environment 38:71–78. 
 Marshall W. B. (1924). "New species of mollusks of the genus Chilina". Proceedings of the United States National Museum 66: 1–5.
 Marshall W. B. (1933). "New fresh-water gastropod mollusks of the genus Chilina of South America". Proceedings of the United States National Museum 82: 1–6.
 Miquel S. E. (1984). "Contribución al conocimiento biológico de gasterópodos pulmonados del área rioplatense, con especial referencia a Chilina fluminea. (Maton) Tesis doctoral. Facultad de Ciencias Naturales y Museo, Universidad Nacional de la Plata. 133 pp.
 Miquel S. E. (1987). "Estudio micro-anatómico del complejo peniano en especies del género Chilina Gray, 1828 (Gastropoda Basommatophora)". Notas del Museo de La Plata 21: Zoología 209. 131–142.
 Valdovinos C. & Stuardo J. (1995). "Morfología funcional de Chilina angusta (Philippi, 1860), y evolución de Chilinidae". Resumos, II Congreso Latino-Americano de Malacología, Porto Alegre, Brasil 43.

External links 

 Photos of shells of Chilinidae
 Photos of live Chilinidae

Chilinidae
Taxa named by John Edward Gray